Julia Campbell (born March 12, 1962) is an American film and television actress. Her most noted role to date was "mean girl" Christie Masters in Romy and Michele's High School Reunion.

Career
Campbell had a starring role in the feature film, Tillamook Treasure (2006), in which she plays Kathryn Kimbell, the mother of the story's lead character. She has appeared on such television shows as Still Standing, Martial Law, Herman's Head, Ally McBeal, Malcolm in the Middle, Seinfeld ("The Frogger" episode), Friends, House, The Mentalist, The Practice, The Pretender, and Dexter. 

Some of her earliest notable roles were on the daytime soap operas Ryan's Hope (in which she played Ryan granddaughter Maura "Katie" Thompson) and Santa Barbara (in which she played Courtney Capwell) and the comedy film Livin' Large. In 2009, she guest starred on the NBC drama Heroes as Mary Campbell, mother of a new recurring character, Luke, in the episode "Trust and Blood".

She appeared on the last episode of the series The Shield, on which her husband Jay Karnes played the character of Dutch Wagenbach, as a lawyer for Dutch's partner, Steve Billings, who is instantly attracted to Dutch.

Personal life
Campbell was born in Redstone Arsenal, near Huntsville, Alabama, the daughter of a model mother and an army officer father. She is married to actor Jay Karnes. Before that, she was married to actor Bernard White.

Filmography

Film

Television

References

1962 births
Living people
American film actresses
American television actresses
American soap opera actresses
Actors from Huntsville, Alabama
Actresses from Alabama
20th-century American actresses
21st-century American actresses